Grabovac is a village in Karlovac County, Croatia. It is on the D1 highway.

Populated places in Karlovac County